Chen Yi-an (born 7 February 1973) is a Taiwanese taekwondo practitioner and actress.

She won a bronze medal in bantamweight at the 1989 World Taekwondo Championships, and a silver medal in lightweight at the 1991 World Taekwondo Championships. She won gold medals at the 1994 and 1998 Asian Taekwondo Championships. She won a gold medal at the 1998 Asian Games.

She played the female lead in the 2017 cult film Story in Taipei.

Chen has a bachelor's degree in business administration from National Chengchi University and a master in sports administration from the University of Taipei. As of 2019, she was a doctoral student at National Taiwan Normal University.

References

External links

1973 births
Living people
Taiwanese female taekwondo practitioners
Taekwondo practitioners at the 1998 Asian Games
Asian Games medalists in taekwondo
Medalists at the 1998 Asian Games
Asian Games gold medalists for Chinese Taipei
World Taekwondo Championships medalists
Asian Taekwondo Championships medalists
20th-century Taiwanese women